Bruno Bernhard Gröning (1906 in Danzig – January 26, 1959 in Paris) was a German mystic who performed faith healings and lectured. He was active in Germany in the 1940s and 1950s after World War II.

Early life 
Gröning was born into a Catholic family in Danzig in 1906. He was the middle child of seven and was raised in the suburb of Oliva. He did not finish school; he began training as a carpenter and worked in a variety of jobs. During the Nazi era, his family changed their last name to the more German "Gröning" from Grönkowski, Grenkowski, or Grzenkowski, and he, his father, and his brother joined the Nazi Party.

Wartime
In March 1943 he was conscripted into the Wehrmacht as a Panzerjäger (an army support service); after stating that he would not kill another human being, he came close to being executed for this stance at a court martial. He was captured by the Soviets in Köslin and from March to October 1945 was in a POW camp in Frankfurt an der Oder, where he argued with his captors for better conditions in the prison.

Career
Gröning came to public attention in 1949. In Herford, the father of a young boy named Dieter Hulsmann, claimed that Gröning had healed his son of muscular dystrophy and told many people of his belief. News of this story circulated and soon crowds gathered in front of the Hulsmann residence, seeking healing. In May 1949, the state of North Rhine-Westphalia (where Herford is located) prohibited Gröning from acting as a healer, and he relocated to the city of Rosenheim in Bavaria, where authorities were more supportive, with the state's minister president Hans Ehard opining that legalities shouldn't impede the activities of such an "extraordinary phenomenon". With intense media coverage in magazines, radio and Wochenschau newsreels, soon tens of thousands of people were filling the horse paddocks near the inn where Gröning was lodging at the outskirts of Rosenheim, hoping that his "healing rays" (Heilstrahlen) would cure them of war injuries, blindness, and other handicaps and ailments. Gröning spoke to them from a balcony and had small tin foil balls (allegedly charged with his healing powers) distributed to those that he was unable to touch in person. While he did not demand money, he is assumed to have received a substantial amount of donations. After six months Gröning was forced to leave Rosenheim amid charges of negligent homicide of a 17-year-old girl with lung disease; he later received several suspended prison sentences and fines.

Teachings 
Gröning said that his ideas were not a new teaching or religion, but rather an ancient knowledge that had been lost, saying that people had forgotten "the most important thing", that there is a higher power or force that is available to help people.

Gröning regarded health (rather than illness and disease) as the natural state of all living things and asserted that one can maintain health and heal from illness by absorption of a Divine life force that he called heilstrom. which translates into English as "healing wave" or "healing stream".

Tuning in to divine energy 
To connect with and receive this energy, Gröning taught a technique he called einstellen (German for "tuning in"). He said that human beings were like batteries that used energy. To maintain health, a person needed to daily renew themselves by tuning into the healing wave. The practice of einstellen consists of sitting in an upright position with arms and legs uncrossed and palms facing upwards. He stated that it was very important for the back to be straight and to not have any kind of backrest if possible. Inwardly the practice consists of having the wish to receive the heilstrom, having faith that healing is possible, and then focusing on the body, observing body sensations and feelings.

He told people to "take on health" and that specifically in regard to healing it is permissible, even necessary, to be selfish, that is, to focus on oneself.

Gröning believed that when a person tunes into the healing stream that healings can occur spontaneously or slowly, depending on variables such as the quantity of life force flowing through the body, accelerated during einstellen. Sometimes the symptoms may worsen or increased pain is experienced before a healing occurs. Gröning called this occurrence regelungen (German for "regulation" or "adjustments") and stated that it is sometimes a necessary part of the healing process.

Reception 
Media coverage of Gröning was mostly negative. While some called him a "miracle doctor", the popular press of the time tended to call him a "charlatan" or "crazy."

In many towns Gröning was forbidden from making public appearances for a variety of reasons. One charge brought against him was of practicing medicine without a license. At other times officials were concerned about the large crowds that gathered.

Following 
Various groups continue to promulgate Gröning's teaching, including the Circle of Information, the Bruno Groening Trust, the Bruno Groening Friends, the Association for the Advancement in Germany of Spiritual and Natural-Psychological Foundations for Living, the Association for Natural Spiritual Living, the Bruno Gröning Circle of Friends, and Help and Healing Sessions.

Gröning founded the Association for the Advancement in 1958 to replace the Gröning Association. The Circle of Friends was founded in 1979 by Grete Hausler, an Austrian school teacher who worked closely with Gröning. The Circle of Information was created by Thomas Busse, who has written a number of books about Gröning and directed the documentary film The Gröning Phenomena. Help and Healing Sessions is an association of independent Gröning groups and hosts online meetings.

The Bruno Gröning Circle of Friends was listed as a commercial cult in an official 1997 report by the Berlin Senate Committee.

Personal life

Apprenticeships 
Leaving school at fifth grade, Gröning began a business apprenticeship. He had to give this up after two and a half years, due his father, a bricklayer foreman, insisting he learn a trade. He apprenticed in carpentry, but this was interrupted three months short of finishing when the firm closed down due to the business turmoil of the post-war period. He then worked at various jobs. Egon Arthur Schmidt wrote of this time:

He was a success at any work he turned his hand to.
Various workmates of his told me that a noticeable feature was that whatever he turned his hand to, he was able to do, whether it was repairing clocks or radios, or whether he was working as a locksmith. He was especially suited to technical things. Also, he was never shy about taking on the roughest and physically most strenuous work. As a dockworker, he pulled his weight. He made no secret of the fact that doing all this was connected to the path which led him through the depths, in order to reach the heights. An old chinese proverb says, ‘He who has never been through the swamp, cannot become holy.’ There are plenty of reports from among his early compatriots, one of which reached me recently. In it the writer says plainly and simply and without reservation, that having worked with him for a year, he was the best and most decent comrad he ever had, and holds fond memories of him.

Marriage and family misfortunes 
He married at 21. However, his wife did not understand him. She wanted to confine him to the narrow role of a respectable family man and dismissed the healings as "vagaries." Both sons, Harald and Günter, born 1931 and 1939, respectively, died at the age of nine. Although countless people had already experienced Gröning's healing, Gertrud Gröning did not believe in her husband’s healing power, instead she entrusted the children to the doctors who proved ineffective. Both boys died in the hospital, Harald in 1940 in Gdansk, and Günter in 1949 in Dillenburg. These were heavy blows of fate for Gröning and years later, he still wept when he spoke about his sons.

Military service and activism 
Gröning was at the Russian front and a prisoner of war in 
World War II. He was called up to the armed forces in 1943. Here he came into conflict with his military superiors. Because he refused to shoot people, he was threatened with a court martial. In the end however, he was sent to the front anyway. He was wounded, became a Russian prisoner of war and returned to West Germany in 1945 as a refugee.

Gröning’s conduct during the war was dictated by his desire to help even at the front where he used every opportunity to help his comrades and the civilian population. In a Russian village, he was able to arrange for the people dying of starvation to gain access to the army's food reserves. As a prisoner, he fought for better clothing, better food and better shelter for his fellow prisoners. Gröning helped countless men suffering from starvation edema back to health.

Marital separation and dedication to humanity 
In December of 1945, he was freed and built a new life for himself and his family in Dillenburg in Hesse. After his second son died and his wife tried to prevent all his charitable activities, he separated from her. He wanted the healing power at his disposal to flow to all people, saying, "I don't belong to individuals. I belong to humanity."

Early in 1949, his path led him to the Ruhr District. As a result of the reports of a few healed individuals, increasing numbers of people became aware of Bruno Gröning. He went from house to house, where needed, where sick people asked him for help. He worked in small circles until, in March 1949, he accepted the invitation from an engineer in Herford to visit his son.

Death
Gröning died at the age of 52 of stomach cancer; his ashes were buried in Dillenburg next to his younger son.

References

Notes

Sources

External links
 

1906 births
1959 deaths
Deaths from cancer in France
Faith healers
German occultists
German prisoners of war in World War II held by the Soviet Union
People from Gdańsk